The 3rd parallel north is a circle of latitude that is 3 degrees north of the Earth's equatorial plane. It crosses the Atlantic Ocean, Africa, the Indian Ocean, Southeast Asia, the Pacific Ocean and South America.

Around the world
Starting at the Prime Meridian and heading eastwards, the parallel 3° north passes through:

{| class="wikitable plainrowheaders"
! scope="col" | Co-ordinates
! scope="col" | Country, territory or sea
! scope="col" | Notes
|-valign="top"
| style="background:#b0e0e6;" | 
! scope="row" style="background:#b0e0e6;" | Atlantic Ocean
| style="background:#b0e0e6;" | Gulf of Guinea - passing just south of Bioko island, 
|-
| 
! scope="row" | 
|
|-
| 
! scope="row" | 
| For about 2km
|-
| 
! scope="row" | 
| For about 3km
|-
| 
! scope="row" | 
|
|-
| 
! scope="row" | 
|
|-
| 
! scope="row" | 
|
|-
| 
! scope="row" | 
|
|-
| 
! scope="row" | 
| Passing through Lake Turkana
|-
| 
! scope="row" | 
|
|-
| style="background:#b0e0e6;" | 
! scope="row" style="background:#b0e0e6;" | Indian Ocean
| style="background:#b0e0e6;" |
|-
| 
! scope="row" | 
| Laamu Atoll
|-
| style="background:#b0e0e6;" | 
! scope="row" style="background:#b0e0e6;" | Indian Ocean
| style="background:#b0e0e6;" | Passing just north of the island of Simeulue, 
|-
| 
! scope="row" | 
| Island of Sumatra
|-
| style="background:#b0e0e6;" | 
! scope="row" style="background:#b0e0e6;" | Strait of Malacca
| style="background:#b0e0e6;" |
|-
| 
! scope="row" | 
| Selangor, Negeri Sembilan and Pahang again, on Peninsular Malaysia
|-
| style="background:#b0e0e6;" | 
! scope="row" style="background:#b0e0e6;" | South China Sea
| style="background:#b0e0e6;" | Passing just north of the island of Tioman, 
|-
| 
! scope="row" | 
| Island of Jemaja
|-
| style="background:#b0e0e6;" | 
! scope="row" style="background:#b0e0e6;" | South China Sea
| style="background:#b0e0e6;" |
|-
| 
! scope="row" | 
| Island of Midai
|-
| style="background:#b0e0e6;" | 
! scope="row" style="background:#b0e0e6;" | South China Sea
| style="background:#b0e0e6;" |
|-
| 
! scope="row" | 
| Island of Subi
|-
| style="background:#b0e0e6;" | 
! scope="row" style="background:#b0e0e6;" | South China Sea
| style="background:#b0e0e6;" |
|-
| 
! scope="row" | 
| Sarawak, island of Borneo
|-
| 
! scope="row" | 
| North Kalimantan, island of Borneo - for about 8km
|-
| 
! scope="row" | 
| Sarawak, island of Borneo - for about 10km
|-
| 
! scope="row" | 
| North Kalimantan, island of Borneo
|-
| style="background:#b0e0e6;" | 
! scope="row" style="background:#b0e0e6;" | Celebes Sea
| style="background:#b0e0e6;" |
|-
| style="background:#b0e0e6;" | 
! scope="row" style="background:#b0e0e6;" | Molucca Sea
| style="background:#b0e0e6;" |
|-
| style="background:#b0e0e6;" | 
! scope="row" style="background:#b0e0e6;" | Pacific Ocean
| style="background:#b0e0e6;" | Passing just south of Butaritari atoll, 
|-
| 
! scope="row" | 
| Island of Gorgona island, and mainland
|-
| style="background:#b0e0e6;" | 
! scope="row" style="background:#b0e0e6;" | Pacific Ocean
| style="background:#b0e0e6;" |
|-
| 
! scope="row" | 
|
|-
| 
! scope="row" | 
|
|-
| 
! scope="row" | 
| Roraima
|-
| 
! scope="row" | Disputed area
|-
| 
! scope="row" | 
|
|-
| 
! scope="row" | Disputed area
|-
| 
! scope="row" | 
|
|-
| 
! scope="row" | Disputed area
|-
| 
! scope="row" | 
| French Guiana
|-
| 
! scope="row" | 
| Amapá
|-
| style="background:#b0e0e6;" | 
! scope="row" style="background:#b0e0e6;" | Atlantic Ocean
| style="background:#b0e0e6;" |
|-
|}

See also
2nd parallel north
4th parallel north

n03